The Covington Lumberjacks are a collegiate summer baseball team in Covington, Virginia.  They play in the southern division of the Valley Baseball League. The team was founded in 2001 and the Lumberjacks play their home games at Casey Field in downtown Covington. 
The Lumberjacks won the leagues Southern Division regular season title in 2018. The Lumberjacks have been consistent in having alumni drafted in the major leagues, including several who have had substantial MLB careers.

Notable players
David Carpenter, catcher/pitcher
Ben Guez, outfielder
Jason Kipnis, second baseman
Collin Cowgill, outfielder
Robby Scott, pitcher
Craig Tatum, catcher
Kevin Munson, pitcher
Brendan Katin, outfielder
Carlos Guevara, pitcher
Sherman Johnson, second baseman

References

External links
Home site
Covington Lumberjacks roster

Amateur baseball teams in Virginia
Valley Baseball League teams
Alleghany County, Virginia
Covington, Virginia